Decha Srangdee (born Sep 1, 1990) is a Thai professional footballer who currently plays for Trat in the Thai League T2.

References

External links
 
 

1990 births
Living people
Decha Srangdee
Decha Srangdee
Association football defenders
Decha Srangdee
Decha Srangdee
Decha Srangdee
Decha Srangdee